Patrick Ball (born June 26, 1965) is a scientist who has spent more than twenty years conducting quantitative analysis for truth commissions, non-governmental organizations, international criminal tribunals, and United Nations missions in El Salvador, Ethiopia, Guatemala, Haiti, South Africa, Chad, Sri Lanka, East Timor, Sierra Leone, South Africa, Kosovo, Liberia, Peru, Colombia, the Democratic Republic of Congo, and Syria. As executive director of Human Rights Data Analysis Group, he assists human rights defenders by conducting rigorous scientific and statistical analysis of large-scale human rights abuses. He received his bachelor of arts degree from Columbia University, and his doctorate from the University of Michigan.

Human rights and cryptography export controls 
During the 1990s-era controversies over the export of strong cryptography by United States software developers, Ball's technical background and expertise in human rights conflicts led him to advocate for the widespread availability of cryptographic technology.

In 1993, he began working with the Science and Human Rights Program of the American Association for the Advancement of Science, initially as a consultant and eventually as deputy director. His work with the AAAS included traveling to countries such as El Salvador and Ethiopia to train local human rights organizations on the use of cryptography and the Internet to protect their communications. The Science and Human Rights Program also organized or co-organized numerous symposiums, including a congressional briefing at which Ball presented alongside Matt Blaze, Ian Goldberg, and Dinah PoKempner.

In 1997, Ball provided expert testimony in ACLU v. Miller, a case from the civil liberties group challenging a Georgia law barring online pseudonymity as unconstitutionally vague and overbroad.

Expert testimony in war crimes trials
Ball served as an expert witness in testimony at the International Criminal Tribunal for the former Yugoslavia against Slobodan Milosevic, the former President of Serbia. He was also an expert witness for the Prosecution at the International Criminal Tribunal for the former Yugoslavia in Milutinović et al. (IT-05-87).

In 2013, Ball provided expert testimony in Guatemala's Supreme Court in the trial of General José Efraín Ríos Montt, the de facto president of Guatemala in 1982-1983. Ríos was found guilty of genocide and crimes against humanity; it was the first time ever that a former head of state was found guilty of genocide in his own country. Ball also testified in 2013 in the trial of Guatemala's former national police chief, Héctor Rafael Bol de la Cruz, who was sentenced to 40 years in prison for the disappearance of a student union leader.

In September 2015, Ball provided expert testimony in the trial of former President of Chad, Hissène Habré. HRDAG's analysis showed that the death rate for political prisoners was much higher than for adult men in Chad: 90 to 540 times higher. On its worst day in the time period for which data were analyzed, the mortality rate was 2.37 deaths per 100 prisoners. During a nine-month period in 1986-1987, the mortality rate in Habré's prisons was higher than that of US POWs in Japanese custody during World War II.

Awards

Ball was conferred a Doctor of Science honoris causa by Claremont Graduate University in 2015. In 2014, he was named a Fellow by the American Statistical Association. Other awards include the Karl E. Peace Award for Outstanding Statistical Contributions for the Betterment of Society from the American Statistical Association in 2018, the Pioneer Award from the Electronic Frontier Foundation in 2005, the Eugene L. Lawler Award for Humanitarian Contributions within Computer Science from the Association for Computing Machinery (ACM) in June 2004, and a Special Achievement Award from the Social Statistics Section of the American Statistical Association in 2002. He is a Research Fellow at the Carnegie Mellon University Center for Human Rights Science, and a Fellow at the Human Rights Center at Berkeley Law of the University of California, Berkeley.

Selected publications
 Amelia Hoover Green and Patrick Ball (2019). Civilian killings and disappearances during civil war in El Salvador (1980–1992). Demographic Research, 1 October 2019. 
 Patrick Ball and Megan Price (2019). Using Statistics to Assess Lethal Violence in Civil and Inter-State War. Annual Review of Statistics and Its Application. 7 March 2019. 
 Patrick Ball and Megan Price (2018). The Statistics of Genocide. Chance (special issue). February 2018. 
 Patrick Ball (2016). The case against a golden key. Foreign Affairs. September 14, 2016. Foreign Affairs. 
 Patrick Ball (2016). Violence in blue. Granta 134: 4 March 2016.
 Patrick Ball (2016). Why Just Counting the Dead in Syria Won’t Bring Them Justice. Foreign Policy. October 19, 2016.
 Megan Price and Patrick Ball (2014). Big Data, Selection Bias, and the Statistical Patterns of Mortality in Conflict. SAIS Review of International Affairs.  
 Price, Megan, Jeff Klingner, and Patrick Ball (2013). Preliminary Statistical Analysis of Documentation of Killings in the Syrian Arab Republic, The Benetech Human Rights Program, commissioned by the United Nations Office of the High Commissioner for Human Rights (OHCHR).
 Patrick Ball. When It Comes to Human Rights, There Are No Online Security Shortcuts, Wired op-ed, August 10, 2012.
 Patrick Ball (2008). “¿Quién le hizo qué a quién? Planear e implementar un proyecto a gran escala de información en derechos humanos.” (originally in English at AAAS) Translated by Beatriz Verjerano. Palo Alto, California: Benetech.
 Patrick Ball, Tamy Guberek, Daniel Guzmán, Amelia Hoover, and Meghan Lynch (2007). “Assessing Claims of Declining Lethal Violence in Colombia.” Benetech. Also available in Spanish – “Para Evaluar Afirmaciones Sobre la Reducción de la Violencia Letal en Colombia.”
 Patrick Ball, Ewa Tabeau, and Philip Verwimp (2007). “The Bosnian Book of the Dead: Assessment of the Database (Full Report).” Households in Conflict Network Research Design Note 5.
 Silva, Romesh and Patrick Ball, "The Profile of Human Rights Violations in Timor-Leste, 1974-1999", a Report by the Benetech Human Rights Data Analysis Group to the Commission on Reception, Truth and Reconciliation. 9 February 2006. 
 Silva, Romesh, and Patrick Ball. "The Demography of Large-Scale Human Rights Atrocities: Integrating demographic and statistical analysis into post-conflict historical clarification in Timor-Leste." Paper presented at the 2006 meetings of the Population Association of America. 
 Silva, Romesh and Patrick Ball. "The Demography of Conflict-Related Mortality in Timor-Leste (1974-1999): Empirical Quantitative Measurement of Civilian Killings, Disappearances & Famine-Related Deaths" In Papers on Human Rights and Statistics, D. Banks, J. Asher and F. Scheuren, eds., ASA/SIAM Monograph Series, Philadelphia, PA (USA), pp. 42–57. 
 Ball, Patrick. "On the Quantification of Horror: Field Notes on Statistical Analysis of Human Rights Violations." in Repression and Mobilization, ed. by Christian Davenport, Hank Johnston, and Carol Mueller. Minneapolis: U Minnesota P. 2005.  
 Truth and Reconciliation Commission of Perú, Final Report - General Conclusions
 Davenport, Christian, and Patrick Ball. "Views to a Kill: Exploring the Implications of Source Selection in the Case of Guatemalan State Terror, 1977-1996." Journal of Conflict Resolution 46(3): 427-450. 2002.
 Killings and Refugee Flow in Kosovo, March - June, 1999 
  
 Chapman, Audrey R. and Patrick Ball. "The Truth of Truth Commissions: Comparative Lessons from Haiti, South Africa, and Guatemala." Human Rights Quarterly. 23(4):1-42. 2001 
 Policy or Panic? The Flight of Ethnic Albanians from Kosovo, March–May 1999
 Political Killings in Kosovo
 Making the Case: Investigating Large Scale Human Rights Violations Using Information Systems and Data Analysis. (ed. with Herbert F. Spirer and Louise Spirer). Washington, DC: AAAS, 2000. 
 State Violence in Guatemala, 1960-1996: a Quantitative Reflection. (with Paul Kobrak and Herbert F. Spirer) Washington, DC: AAAS, 1999. 
 Who Did What to Whom? Planning and Implementing a Large Scale Human Rights Data Project. Washington, DC: AAAS, 1996.

Notes

References

A Data Double-Take: Police Shootings, The National Review, July 6, 2020.
All the Dead We Cannot See, Pacific Standard, December 28, 2018.
Mapping Mexico's Hidden Graves, Science, June 26, 2017.
A New Estimate of Killings of Police Is Way Higher - And Still Too Low, FiveThirtyEight, March 6, 2015.
Data Mining on the Side of the Angels, Wired, December 29, 2013
Doing the Right Stuff for Human Rights, HuffPost, November 19, 2013.
Calculating Body Counts, NPR's On the Media, March 19, 2012
The Body Counter, Foreign Policy Magazine, March 2, 2012
Five Questions with Patrick Ball, Engineering For Change, October 17, 2011
Patrick Ball on the Perils of Misusing Human Rights Data, Forbes, February 17, 2011
The Forensic Humanitarian, The New York Times, February 17, 2008
A Human Rights Statistician Finds Truth In Numbers, The Christian Science Monitor, February 7, 2008
Guatemala: The Secret Files, PBS Frontline/World, May 27, 2008

External links
Human Rights Data Analysis Group - bio
HRDAG Testifies in Guatemala (news story about Ball's April 2013 testimony in the Guatemalan Supreme Court)

Ball, Patrick
Ball, Patrick
Ball, Patrick
Columbia College (New York) alumni
University of Michigan alumni
Fellows of the American Statistical Association